Quebecois was a lake freighter that served the Great Lakes, operating between ports in the United States and Canada. The vessel was launched in 1962 by Canadian Vickers Ltd of Montreal, Quebec, Canada. Used to carry grain and ore, Quebecois was built to the maximum dimensions allowed on the Saint Lawrence Seaway. The vessel entered service in 1963 and in 2012, the ship's named was altered to Algoma Quebecois. The ship was broken up for scrap at Port Colborne, Ontario, Canada in 2013.

Description

The ship was powered by a  Canadian General Electric Type MD70 two-stage steam turbine engine with Babcock & Wilcox header-type boilers turning one screw and a bow thruster.

Service history
The vessel was a bulk carrier built to the maximum dimensions of the St. Lawrence Seaway locks. Quebecois was the fourth ship of a six-ship design built in the shipbuilding boom following the opening of the seaway. Laid down in June 1962 with the yard number 280 by Canadian Vickers Ltd. at their yard in Montreal, Quebec, Canada the ship was built in two sections with the fore part launched on 8 September 1962 and the aft on 10 November 1962. The vessel was completed on 22 April 1963 and though owned by the Canadian General Electric Company, was chartered by Papachristidis Company. The ship was registered in Montreal. In 1965, Quebecois was acquired by Papachristidis. The laker carried loads of grain and ore between Canadian and American ports along the St. Lawrence Seaway and the Great Lakes.

During the winter lay-up in 1972 Papachristidis sold Quebecois to Jackes Shipping, where the ship was re-registered to Toronto, Ontario. In 1975 Upper Lakes Shipping took over ownership of Quebecois. On 26 August 1979 the laker ran aground on a mud bank at the entrance to Lake St. Clair due to an electronic malfunction. The vessel was freed after nine hours without suffering significant damage. Quebecois ran aground in the St. Lawrence River off Van Rensselaer Point on 12 November 1982. The ship remained aground until freed the next day without major damage. Beginning in October 1990, Quebecois began delivering cement clinker to Duluth, Minnesota. 

In 2011, Upper Lakes Shipping was acquired by Algoma Central. In 2012, the vessel's name was changed to Algoma Quebecois. The vessel was towed to International Marine Salvage in Port Colborne, Ontario on 21 November 2013 where she was broken up for scrap.

Citations

Sources

External links

 

1962 ships
Ships built in Quebec
Great Lakes freighters
Algoma Central Marine